Jeanne Craig Sinkford (born 1933) is an American dentist and academic administrator. She was the first female dean of an American dental school. She is a senior scholar in residence at the American Dental Education Association and a professor and dean emeritus at the dental school of Howard University.

Biography
Sinkford was born in 1933, one of four sisters who all went on to attend college. She said that her parents, a grandfather, and her experiences at a Catholic middle school contributed to her disciplined upbringing. She attended Dunbar High School in Washington, D.C., a school for high-achieving African Americans, where she was a member of the cadet corps.

At the age of 16, Sinkford enrolled in college at Howard University, studying psychology and chemistry before pursuing dental school there. After graduating from dental school, Sinkford was a faculty member in prosthodontics, had a part-time dental practice, and earned a Ph.D. in physiology at Northwestern University. Later, she chaired the prosthodontics department at Howard, and she completed a residency in pediatric dentistry in 1974-1975.

In 1975, Sinkford was named dean of the dental school at Howard, becoming the first female dean at a U.S. dental school. Sinkford remained dean until 1991. Sinkford then became associate executive director of the American Dental Education Association. She established its Center for Equity and Diversity in 1998, and directed it for 17 years.

In 2015, Sinkford received the Distinguished Service Award from the American Dental Association. She is also a past recipient of the Candace Award from the National Coalition of 100 Black Women. She is a member of the Institute of Medicine and a fellow of the American College of Denists and the International College of Dentists.

Sinkford met her husband Stanley at Howard University. He became a cardiologist. They had three children.

References

Living people
1933 births
Howard University alumni
Northwestern University alumni
Howard University faculty
Educators from Washington, D.C.
American dentists
Members of the National Academy of Medicine
Dunbar High School (Washington, D.C.) alumni
20th-century dentists
American women academics
Women dentists
21st-century American women
20th-century American academics
21st-century American academics